The R355 road is a regional road in Ireland linking Ballinasloe to Portumna, all in County Galway.

See also
Roads in Ireland
National primary road
National secondary road

References
Roads Act 1993 (Classification of Regional Roads) Order 2006 – Department of Transport

External links
Boora Bog

Regional roads in the Republic of Ireland
Roads in County Galway